HMSAS Africana was a minesweeping trawler of the South African Seaward Defence Force during the Second World War. She was originally a sea fisheries research vessel and was later fitted for mine-sweeping and survey duties in the early 1930s.

After the war, Africana was returned to the South African Department of Sea Fisheries and was re-fitted as a fishery survey vessel, starting her first post-war survey in May 1947.  She remained in service in this role until 1950 when she was replaced by the new survey vessel Africana II.  She was sold to Benjamin Gelcer who used her as a fishing trawler.  She later joined the fishing fleet of Irwin and Johnson and was used until 1965 when she was finally withdrawn from fishing service and broken up in Table Bay and sold as scrap.

Notes

References

Bibliography
 
 

Maritime history of South Africa
Ships of the South African Navy
Ships built in Aberdeen
Minesweepers of the South African Navy
1930 ships
Mine warfare vessels of the South African Navy